A Stranger Here is an album by American folk musician Ramblin' Jack Elliott, released in 2009. It reached number 5 on the Billboard Top Blues albums charts.

At the 52nd Grammy Awards, A Stranger Here won the Grammy Award for Best Traditional Blues Album.

Track listing 
"Rising High Water Blues" (Blind Lemon Jefferson) – 3:55
"Death Don't Have No Mercy" (Reverend Gary Davis) – 6:08
"Rambler's Blues" (Lonnie Johnson) – 5:14
"Soul of a Man" (Blind Willie Johnson) – 4:16
"Richland Women Blues" (Mississippi John Hurt) – 4:25
"Grinnin' in Your Face" (Son House) – 3:55
"New Stranger Blues" (Tampa Red) – 3:25
"Falling Down Blues" (Furry Lewis) – 4:53
"How Long Blues" (Leroy Carr) – 4:44
"Please Remember Me" (Walter Davis) – 4:03

Personnel
Ramblin' Jack Elliott – vocals, guitar
Greg Leisz – guitar, dobro, mandolin, mandola, Weissenborn
Jay Bellerose – drums, percussion
Keith Ciancia – piano, keyboards
Van Dyke Parks – piano, vibraphone
David Piltch – upright bass
David Hidalgo – guitar, accordion
Production notes:
Joe Henry - producer
Ryan Freeland – engineer, mixing
Gavin Lurssen – mastering
Anabel Sinn – design
Michael "Mick" Wilson – photography

Chart positions

References

2009 albums
Ramblin' Jack Elliott albums
Anti- (record label) albums
Albums produced by Joe Henry